Asmerom may refer to:

Girma Asmerom (died 2016), Eritrean ambassador
Yared Asmerom (born 1980), Eritrean distance-runner
Bolota Asmerom (born 1978), long-distance runner who competed for Eritrea